Vas or VAS may refer to:

Places 
 Vas County, a county in Hungary
 Vas County (former), a former county of the Kingdom of Hungary
 Vas, Kostel, a village in Slovenia
 Vas, Veneto, a frazione of Quero Vas, Italy

People 
 Surname
 Abdul Vas (born 1981), Venezuelan artist
 Anukreethy Vas (born 1998), Indian model and beauty pageant winner 
 Imre Vas (born 1966), Hungarian jurist and politician
 János Vas (born 1984), Hungarian ice hockey player
 Joseph Vas (born 1955), American politician
 Márton Vas (born 1980), Hungarian ice hockey player
 Robert Vas (1931–1978), Hungarian film director

 Given name
 Vas Blackwood (born 1962), British actor
 Vas Coleman (born 1999), professionally known as Yung Bans, American rapper and songwriter
 Vas J Morgan (born 1988), English television personality
 Vas Nuñez (born 1995), Hong Kong footballer

Science and medicine 
 Vas (moth), a genus of moths in the family Erebidae
 Vas deferens, connecting the left and right epididymis to the ejaculatory ducts in male anatomy
 Vaccine-associated sarcoma, a type of malignant tumor found in cats
 Victoria Archaeological Survey, a government organisation in Victoria, Australia
 Visual analogue scale, a psychometric response scale

Technology 
 Vector addition system, a mathematical modeling language
 Vehicle-activated sign
 Virtual address space

Other uses 
 Vas (band), a musical group
 Left Alliance (Finland), a political party in Finland
 Value-added service, a telecommunications industry concept
 Victory at Sea, a 1952 documentary television series
 Victory at Sea (game), a set of naval wargames rules
 Visual Arts Scotland